Sechler may refer to:

People
Craig Sechler (born 1951), American film and voice actor
Ernest Edwin Sechler (1905–1979), aerospace engineer and scientist

Places
Sechler Run, also known as Sechler's Run, a tributary of Mahoning Creek in Montour County, Pennsylvania, in the United States

See also
Seckler (disambiguation)